Stéphane Paut, known professionally as Neige (French: "Snow") (born 16 April 1985), is a French songwriter, singer, multi-instrumentalist musician, and record producer from Bagnols-sur-Cèze, now relocated to Paris. He is the founder of the black metal/shoegaze project Alcest and also the founder for the now-defunct Amesoeurs.

Career 
Neige quickly started to gain public recognition for his involvement as a drummer and live rhythm guitarist for black metal band Peste Noire in the beginning of the 2000s. He also became involved with black metal band Mortifera in 2003 up to the Vastiia Tenebrd Mortifera (2004) album for which he wrote two songs. In parallel, he really started to make a name for himself with his main bands Amesoeurs and Alcest. Alcest's first EP Le Secret (Drakkar Productions; 2005) and album Souvenirs d'un autre monde (Prophecy Productions; 2007) mixing numerous shoegaze rock and metal influences skyrocketed Neige to fame, which led him to lay Amesoeurs to rest. Later he also provided vocals for Old Silver Key and Lantlôs and live bass for Les Discrets. In 2007 he was also asked by Rune Veddaa to make vocals on the forthcoming Forgotten Woods album entitled Intolerance Div. but this collaboration did not come to fruition.

Discography

Alcest

Studio albums 
 Rhythm guitar, drums, vocals on Tristesse Hivernale (demo, 2001)
 Guitars, bass, drums, keyboards, vocals on Le Secret (EP, 2005)
 Guitars, bass, drums, keyboards, vocals on Souvenirs d'un autre monde (2007)
 Guitars, bass, keyboards, vocals on Écailles de Lune (2010)
 Guitars, bass, keyboards, vocals on Les Voyages de l'Âme (2012)
 Guitars, bass, synth, vocals on Shelter (2014)
 Guitars, synth, vocals on Kodama (2016)
 Guitars, bass, synth, vocals on Spiritual Instinct (2019)

Split releases 
 Guitars, bass, keyboard, vocals on Aux Funérailles du Monde.../Tristesse Hivernale with Angmar (2007)
 Guitars, bass, keyboard, vocals on Alcest / Les Discrets (2009)

Amesoeurs

Studio album 
 Guitars, bass, keyboard, vocals on Ruines Humaines (EP, 2006)
 Guitars, bass, keyboard, vocals on Amesoeurs (2009)

 Split releases 
 Guitars, bass, keyboard, vocals on  Valfunde/Amesoeurs Glaciation 
 Vocals on 1994 (EP, 2012)

 Mortifera 
 Drums, guitars, bass on Complainte d'une Agonie Celeste (EP, 2003)
 Drums, guitars, bass on Vastiia Tenebrd Mortifera (2004). Neige wrote "Ciel Brouillé" and "Le Revenant".

 Peste Noire 
 Drums on Aryan Supremacy (demo, 2001)
 Drums on Macabre Transcendance... (demo, 2002)
 Drums on Phalènes et Pestilence – Salvatrice  Averse (demo, 2003)
 Drums and bass on Phalènes et Pestilence (demo, 2005)
 Main vocals on "Dueil Angoisseus", drums on "Nous sommes fanés", drums and bass on "Des médecins malades et des saints séquestrés" and organ on "Phalènes et pestilence..." on La Sanie des siècles – Panégyrique de la dégénérescence (2006)
 Vocals and rhythm guitars on "La Césarienne" and acoustic guitar introduction to "Amour ne m'amoit ne je li" on Folkfuck Folie (2007)
 Bass on ballade cuntre lo anemi francor (2009)

 Phest 
 Guitars on L'immobile (2003)
 Guitars on Harmonia (2004)

 Lantlôs 
 Vocals on Neon (2010)
 Vocals on Agape (2011)

 Old Silver Key 
 Vocals on Tales of Wanderings (2011)

 As a guest 
 Guest vocals on Deafheaven's Sunbather (2013)
 Guest vocals on Déluge's Æther (2015)
 Guitarist live-world premiere with Empyrium
 Guest vocals on Heretoir's The Circle (2017)
 Co-arrangement on "Lyon - Paris 7h34" on Les Discrets' Prédateurs (2017)
 Guest vocals on "Forgotten Paths" on Saor's Forgotten Paths (2019)
 Guest vocals on ISON's  INNER - SPACE. Guest vocals on Harakiri for the Sky's Sing for the Damage We've Done'' (2020)

Notes and references

External links 
 
Interview with Neige

French singer-songwriters
English-language singers from France
French rock singers
French heavy metal guitarists
French male guitarists
Black metal musicians
Shoegaze musicians
French bass guitarists
Rock bass guitarists
French keyboardists
Heavy metal keyboardists
French heavy metal drummers
Male drummers
Living people
21st-century composers
French multi-instrumentalists
1985 births
21st-century guitarists
21st-century drummers
Male bass guitarists
21st-century French singers
21st-century bass guitarists
21st-century French male singers
French male singer-songwriters